Macrozamia viridis is a species of plant in the family Zamiaceae. It is endemic to Australia

Biology
The fact that Macrozamia viridis has an occurrence at only two locations means that it qualifies for Endangered status. The population trend of the species is now decreasing. They can also be found in terrestrial environments.

Location
Macrozamia viridis can be found at the Wyberba and Girraween area in the south of the Darling Downs district of Queensland, Australia. This species of plants grow on sandy soils over granite in moderately wet eucalypt woodlands.

References

Sources

viridis
Flora of Queensland
Cycadophyta of Australia
Endemic flora of Australia
Endangered flora of Australia
Vulnerable flora of Australia
Nature Conservation Act endangered biota
Vulnerable biota of Queensland
Taxonomy articles created by Polbot
Taxa named by Paul Irwin Forster
Taxa named by David L. Jones (botanist)